The 2022–23 season was Vojvodina's 108th season in existence and the club's 17th competing in the Serbian SuperLiga.

Transfers

In

Out

Friendlies

Summer training camp

Winter training camp

Competitions

Overview

Serbian SuperLiga

Regular season

League table

Results by matchday

Results

Serbian Cup

Statistics

Squad statistics 

|-
! colspan=14 style="background:red; color:white; text-align:center;"| Goalkeepers

|-
! colspan=14 style="background:red; color:white; text-align:center;"| Defenders

|-
! colspan=14 style="background:red; color:white; text-align:center;"| Midfielders

|-
! colspan=14 style="background:red; color:white; text-align:center;"| Forwards

|-
! colspan=14 style="background:red; color:white; text-align:center;"| Players transferred out during the season

|-

Goal scorers 

Last updated: 11 March 2023

Clean sheets 

Last updated: 11 March 2023

Disciplinary record 

Last updated: 11 March 2023

Game as captain 

Last updated: 11 March 2023

References 

FK Vojvodina seasons
Vojvodina